An International XI cricket team toured numerous countries from January to April 1968 and their itinerary included four first-class matches in Pakistan, India and Ceylon during February and March. The team consisted of Mickey Stewart (captain), Roger Tolchard (wk), Derek Underwood, Dennis Amiss, Keith Fletcher, Khalid Ibadulla, Harold Rhodes, Gamini Goonesena, Ken Suttle, Harry Latchman and Mike Denness.

The match in Ceylon was versus the Ceylon Board President's XI at the Paikiasothy Saravanamuttu Stadium in Colombo, the International XI winning by 194 runs after Underwood produced the outstanding figures of eight for 10 and seven for 33.

References

External links

1968 in Ceylon
1968 in Indian cricket
1968 in Pakistani cricket
Indian cricket seasons from 1945–46 to 1969–70
Pakistani cricket seasons from 1947–48 to 1969–70
International cricket competitions from 1945–46 to 1960
Sri Lankan cricket seasons from 1880–81 to 1971–72
Multi-national cricket tours of India
Multi-national cricket tours of Sri Lanka
Multi-national cricket tours of Pakistan